Erin Fetherston is an American designer from Piedmont, California. She graduated from UC Berkeley before attending Parson's School of Design.

In January 2005, she first presented her eponymous label during the Paris Haute Couture Shows.  From its debut, the collection established Fetherston's signature feminine, whimsical and romantic sensibility, earning the brand a devoted following of press and celebrities. In 2007, Fetherston moved to New York City, where she has since shown her ready-to-wear collection during New York City Fashion Week.

Fetherston is also known for her multi-media projects, creating short films and photographic works in tandem with photographer Ellen Von Unwerth featuring Kirsten Dunst, Zooey Deschanel and Karen Elson.

Among her honors, Fetherston was a recipient of the 2007 Ecco Domani Fashion Foundation Award, a finalist for the 2007 CFDA/Vogue Fashion Fund, and in 2009 was inducted as a member of the CFDA.

In November 2007, her limited-time discount line debuted at the nationwide retailer Target.

In April 2010, Fetherston was named as guest designer and creative consultant for the irreverent lifestyle brand Juicy Couture.

Fetherston debuted her contemporary offering 'ERIN' in 2011. The collection can be found at Neiman Marcus, Saks Fifth Avenue, Bloomingdale's, Barneys Japan, Harvey Nichols Hong Kong, and United Arrows as well as specialty boutiques worldwide.

In May 2013, Fetherston married musician Gabe Saporta, and in February 2016, they had a son.

Fetherston now lives with her family in Los Angeles and the 'Erin Fetherston' brand offering has expanded to include designer apparel, home goods, and accessories.

Gallery

References

External links
 Official Site
 
 Erin Fetherston Profile
 Erin Fetherston talks about her personal style
 Erin Fetherston Official Instagram

University of California, Berkeley alumni
American fashion designers
People from Piedmont, California
Living people
1977 births